A by-election was held for the Victorian Legislative Assembly seat of Greensborough on 15 April 1989. The by-election was triggered by the resignation on 28 February of Pauline Toner, the sitting Labor member, who died on 3 March.

The election was won by the Labor candidate Sherryl Garbutt, despite a 16-point swing on first preferences. Garbutt was a former schoolteacher, while the Liberal candidate Margaret Brown ran a catering business. Her husband at the time was Neil Brown, a member of the federal shadow cabinet and a former deputy Liberal leader.

Results

References

1989 elections in Australia
Victorian state by-elections
1980s in Victoria (Australia)